Haines Junction Airport  is located  northwest of Haines Junction, Yukon, Canada. The airport has no scheduled airline service and is served by one fixed wing charter and two helicopter operators. Haines Junction is the gateway to Kluane National Park and Reserve. The airport is also the headquarters for the Yukon Governments Community and Transportation Services Airport Division.

Gallery

References

External links
Page about this airport on COPA's Places to Fly airport directory

Registered aerodromes in Yukon